Royal Prussian Jagdstaffel 88, commonly abbreviated to Jasta 88, was a "hunting group" (i.e., fighter squadron) of the Luftstreitkräfte, the air arm of the Imperial German Army during World War I.

History
Jasta 88 was founded on 28 or 29 October 1918. Its predecessor was Kampfeinsitzerstaffel ("Scout Detachment") 8. The new squadron never became operational.

References

Bibliography
 

88
Military units and formations established in 1918
1918 establishments in Germany
Military units and formations disestablished in 1918